Tampa Creek is a stream in the U.S. state of Mississippi.

Tampa in this context may be a name derived from the Choctaw language; it's purported to mean "offal, refuse".

References

Rivers of Mississippi
Rivers of Wayne County, Mississippi
Mississippi placenames of Native American origin